Mouse (stylized as "MØUSE") is a Japanese manga series written by Satoru Akahori and illustrated by Hiroshi Itaba. It was serialized in Hakusensha's Young Animal between 1999 and 2004. Mouse was adapted into a twelve-episode anime television series written by Hiroyuki Kawasaki, directed by Yorifusa Yamaguchi, and produced by Media Factory and Studio Deen. In 2005, Hakusensha published a one-volume manga prequel titled .

Plot
For 400 years, there was a family of thieves stealing money and priceless property, particularly those items that were originally illegally stolen. The main motivation is that anything and everything can be stolen, no matter how much they protect that item. And in those years, that thief was only known by one name, Mouse.

In the latest version, a young college art teacher named Muon Sorata is the latest to take up the name of Mouse. He is surrounded by three highly devoted and attractive assistants who help him pull off heists of art museums and landmark towers. The thieves have the power and resources to steal entire buildings and take structures out to sea but never get caught. Mouse is also known for not abandoning those who serve him, even if it means his capture.

Characters

Mouse Team

A male college art teacher who is actually a thief under the name Mouse. He follows a 400-year tradition as Mouse and will not abandon those who serve him. As Mouse, Sorata has access to a vast arsenal of vehicles and machines to help him, all of which are hidden underneath the college where he works. At school he is usually seen messing up with his teacher duties, gaining a stern lecture from Mei, Yayoi and Hazuki (with everyone unaware of their relationship with him). He is a very popular teacher, gaining attraction from many of his female students. Though he usually tries to avoid having sex, after becoming drunk he obtains a limitless sex drive, sleeping with countless women as well as wearing out the usually sex driven Mei, Yayoi and Kakio with no sights of slowing down, however after he sobers up he does not remember anything he did. He is friends with Inspector Minami and his daughter Rika, who he sees like a family, though they are unaware he is Mouse. He has a fear of stag beetles because of a childhood trauma where when hunting for one, he went to urinate just as a stag beetle pinched him on his manhood.

An extremely voluptuous female computer and physics expert, who works at the college's physics department as a math teacher. She had been trained since childhood to be the servant to Sorata, but decided that she would not follow Mouse blindly until she saw him herself, even planning to kill herself if she was made to follow a man she did not respect. When she was injured during a mission, she made the choice to follow Sorata with her heart when he would not abandon her, in spite of her insistence that he do (Steals 4 and 5). Her grandfather is the chairman of the school, though the school itself is owned by the Muon family. As the first servant to meet Sorata, she is incredibly loyal to him. As the series progressed she came to realize that she is in love with him, showing jealousy when he goes on dates and being the most worried during his more dangerous heists.

An incredibly curvaceous and well-endowed female biology expert, so skilled that when she was hired on to the research team, they made sure to staff the team with only females just for her, and is also the college's nurse. When she was a college student, Yayoi was cursed with a fear of men (where in the manga this fear seemed to originate from seeing her parents having sex) so great that she goes into panic attacks whenever she even sees a man. So she was curious that her classmate, Mei Momozona, engaged in an intimate relationship with a student she was tutoring, Sorata Muon. But later, when a valuable sample was targeted by Mouse to be stolen, Yayoi found herself trapped when one of her panic attacks triggered a major fire in the lab she was in. It was Sorata, who was really Mouse, who had rescued her and allowed her to come out of her shell (Steals 10 to 12). She is one of his most devoted servants, and is always trying to make him some concoction to give him more sexual energy. Of Mouse's three servants, Yayoi is the most sexually driven, regularly showing a strong masochistic-side from various fantasies of bondage and the likes with Mouse.

A female fighter and expert in martial arts, who is also the college's physical education instructor. There are several personalities within her, from a mischievous child to a brave fighter. When Hazuki foolishly tested a memory-erasing machine and her many personalities were programmed into its computer, Sorata went in to save her by going in himself. While Sorata went in search of the Kakio family treasure, he discovered Hazuki in what seemed to be a debilitated, emotionally fractured, and dissociated state where she was forced to be completely cut off from the rest of the world. By gaining her trust and promising never to leave her as her family had, Sorata was about to uncover the secret and truth behind the Kakio family treasure (Steals 18 to 20). She has a habit of appearing in the strangest places (bathroom, washing machine, etc) while wearing only a kinbaku as well as having a penchant for cosplay.

School
Mr. Fuyuharu
Principal of the school and grandfather to Mei. He is very proud to be serving the Muon family as well as taking care of the school, which the Muon family owns. He often asks Sorata if there is anything he could possibly do to be of service to him, and becomes really worried if he believes he has done something to upset him.
Machiko Tsukioka
 Seems to be the leader of three girls that attend Sorata's art class and are fans of the notorious Mouse. She has obvious feelings for Sorata, getting jealous at the thought of him having a girlfriend. She and her friends refer to him as Chuu-chan, ironically "chuu" is the Japanese onomatopoeia for a mouse's squeak, while they are unaware that he himself is Mouse.

Police
Captain Onizuka Heitaro
Is completely driven to capture Mouse at all cost. He gets extremely angry at how the media always poses Mouse as something of a hero figure and how Mouse always manages to escape. He is extremely similar to Inspector Zenigata in the anime series Lupin the III, even wearing a similar trenchcoat.

Masatoshi Minami
The Captain's assistant and does his best to try to calm the Captain's outbursts when trying to capture Mouse. He has a daughter named Rika and is friends with Sorata, but he is unaware of his true identity.

Other
Rika Minami
Nine year old daughter to Inspector Minami and friends with Sorata. She is unaware that Sorata is Mouse though she has a crush on him, stating that she will become his bride once she grows up. She now owns the Golden Hair Cat that Mouse stole and gave to her for her birthday after dying its hair black (though he told her in secret what it really was).
Natsuko Muon
She is Sorata's step mother that seems to have a lustful attraction to her step son not unlike his slaves. She is only four years older than he is and she revealed that before she became Sorata's stepmother, she was one of his father's slaves, sparking hope in Mei, Yayoi and Kakio at the idea to being more than a slave to him.

4S
An organization originally created to protect valuable artwork out of the hands of thieves. However, the organization has lost its way and has become the largest black market dealers of stolen artwork as well as assassins. They are the primary antagonists in the series.

Episode list

Theme music
 Opening
 "Mouse Chu Mouse" by Under17

 Ending
 "Intellimouse" by Under17

References

External links
Mouse at Media Factory 
Mouse at Studio Deen 
Mouse at Young Animal 

2003 anime television series debuts
Hakusensha franchises
Hakusensha manga
Satoru Akahori
Seinen manga
Studio Deen